Krasnaya Kurya (Gördkurja) is a rural locality (a settlement) in Kochyovskoye Rural Settlement, Kochyovsky District, Perm Krai, Russia. The population was 92 as of 2010. There are 3 streets.

Geography 
Krasnaya Kurya is located 22 km southeast of Kochyovo (the district's administrative centre) by road. Vaskino is the nearest rural locality.

References 

Rural localities in Kochyovsky District